Operation Champion Sword was a joint military operation by the forces of the United States and Afghanistan as part of an International Security Assistance Force against the Taliban and allies. Lasting for a week, the operation resulted in the capture of 14 militants and homemade bomb-makers, as well as improving the general security of Khost Province. The operation targeted safe havens and terrorist hideouts in the Sabari and Tere Zayi districts of Khost province.

References

Military operations of the War in Afghanistan (2001–2021)